Mouse is a 2012 Sri Lankan Sinhala children's film directed and produced by Wasantha Moragoda for MDC Media. It stars Kaushalya Fernando and Roshan Ravindra in lead roles along with child artist Thisal Thulnith and Robin Fernando. Music composed by Sunil Dayananda. It is the 1171st Sri Lankan film in the Sinhala cinema.

Plot

Cast
 Thisal Thulnith as Sukiri
 Kaushalya Fernando as Rangi
 Wasantha Moragoda as Wijepala
 Robin Fernando as Principal
 Roshan Ravindra as Drug addict
 Srimal Wedisinghe as Alagiyawanna
 Awanthi Aponso as Alagiyawanna's wife
 Jayani Senanayake as Servant
 Chathura Frenando as Teacher
 Chandi Ranasinghe
 Adisha Hettiarachchi as Adisha
 Lithmal Lokith
 Suren Rajapakse as Monk

Songs

References

2012 films
2010s Sinhala-language films